2000 J.League Cup Final was the 8th final of the J.League Cup competition. The final was played at National Stadium in Tokyo on November 4, 2000. Kashima Antlers won the championship.

Match details

See also
2000 J.League Cup

References

J.League Cup
2000 in Japanese football
Kashima Antlers matches
Kawasaki Frontale matches